Kadesh, or Qadesh, was an ancient city of the Levant on or near the headwaters or a ford of the Orontes River. It was of some importance during the Late Bronze Age and is mentioned in the Amarna letters. It was the site of the Battle of Kadesh between the Hittite and Egyptian empires in the 13th century BC.

Name and location 
The name is from the West Semitic (Canaanite) root Q-D-Š "holy". It is rendered Qdšw in Egyptian and Kadeš in Hittite. Akkadian spelling variants include Kinza,  Kidša, Gizza.

The text of the Kadesh inscriptions locates Kadesh as being near Tunip in the land of the Amurru, itself assumed to have been near the Orontes River (perhaps at Tell Salhab).

Some scholars also identify Kadesh with the city of Kadytis (Καδύτις in Greek) mentioned by Herodotus (2.159, an alternative identification for Kadytis being 
Gaza.

Chalcolithic
The site of Tell Nebi Mend was first occupied during the Chalcolithic period.

Early Bronze
In the late Early Bronze, the site is known for White-on-Blackweel Ware. This ware appeared in the transitional EB III/IV (Phase O), flourished and was trade in the Orontes Valley up to the Plains of Antioch and to eastern North Syria in EB IVA (Phase N). In EB IVB (Phase M), the ware continued features from the previous phase, but is easily distinguishable. It disappeares in the transitional EB IV/MB I (Phase L). Comparison should be made with Hama J7-5 (EB IVA) and J4-2 (EB IVB).

Middle Bronze Age
The city first entered historical records when it was mentioned in the archive of Mari in the 18th century BC as the headquarter of king Ishi-Addu of Qatna who took up residence there to oversee the quelling of a rebellion in the south of the city.

Late Bronze Age
Kadesh was coming under the influence of the growing Hittite Empire between 1500 and 1285 BC. It was the target of military campaigns by most of the pharaohs of the Eighteenth Dynasty of Egypt.

Between 1504 and 1492 BC Thutmosis I campaigned north into Syria against the Mitanni, a vassal of the Hittites and, along with Aram, an ally of Kadesh.  In the time of Hatshepsut there were no campaigns against Kadesh as she was focused on developing trade across the Red Sea and southward.

Kadesh is first noted as one of two Canaanite cities (the other being Megiddo) that led a coalition of city-states opposing the conquest of the Levant by Thutmose III. In mounting this opposition, the king of Kadesh was probably guided by the ruler of Mittani, Egypt's primary foreign rival in control of the Levant. Defeat in the subsequent Battle of Megiddo ultimately led to the extension of Egyptian hegemony over the city, as well as the rest of southern Syria.

Although Amenophis II campaigned in the Djadi from then on until the reign of Horemheb (1319–1307) for a century and a half Canaan was independent of Egyptian rule.

Amarna letters
Correspondence between the ruler of Kadesh and the pharaoh Akhenaten is preserved amongst the Amarna letters. Kadesh is known as Qidshu in these Akkadian language letters.

The names of three kings of Kadesh survive from contemporary sources: Suttarna (or Sutatarra; fl. c. 1350 BC); Etakkama (c. 1340s) and his son Ari-Teshub (fl. c. 1330–1325).

Seti I campaign
The city was captured by the great pharaoh Seti I in 1306 BC, during his campaign to Syria. Kadesh had been lost to Egypt since the time of Akhenaten. Tutankhamun and Horemheb had both failed to recapture the city from the Hittites. Seti I was successful here and defeated a Hittite army that tried to defend it. He triumphantly entered the city together with his son Ramesses II and erected a victory stela at the site.

His success was only temporary. As soon as Seti I returned to Egypt, the Hittite king, Mursilis II, marched south to take Kadesh and made it a stronghold of the Hittite defenses in Syria. The Hittites ruled through a viceroy in Carchemish.

Battle of Kadesh

The city is best known as the location of one of the best documented battles of the ancient world, the Battle of Kadesh, staged between the superpowers of the 13th century BC: the Egyptian and Hittite Empires. An Egyptian vassal for approximately 150 years, Kadesh eventually defected to Hittite suzerainty, thereby placing the city on the contested frontier between the two rival empires.

In response to this Hittite ascendancy and expansion southwards, the Egyptian pharaoh Ramesses II prepared an aggressive military response and captured the coastal state of Amurru.

In 1274 BC, the fifth year of Ramesses' reign, he led a large force of chariots and infantry  to retake the walled city. In the Battle of Kadesh, the two forces clashed, in what is widely regarded as the largest chariot versus chariot battle (5,000–6,000 between both sides) in history, on the plain south of the city and west of the Orontes River.

The next year, the Hittites moved south to recover Amurru, while the Egyptians moved north to continue their expansion into Syria.  The inhabitants of the city of Kadesh had cut a channel from the river to a stream south of the town, which had turned the town into a virtual island.

The subsequent battle, fought at Kadesh, saw the Egyptians turning a near defeat into victory, routing the enemy forces. After Hittite spies convinced the Egyptians that the Hittites were further away than they were, the Hittites surprised the Egyptians in their own camp. The Egyptian army was only saved by the arrival of a supporting force from coastal Amurru. Ramesses II was able to recover the initiative, and the two armies withdrew in stalemate, both claiming victory.

Aftermath
Kadesh, however, remained under Hittite overlordship, Amurru returned to the Hittite fold, and the Hittite army continued its conquests southward as far as Upi, the territory around Damascus.

The subsequent impasse between Egypt and Hatti ultimately led to what is now recognised as one of the earliest surviving international peace treaties, concluded several decades later between Ramesses II and his Hittite counterpart, Hattusili III.

End of Kadesh
Kadesh vanished from history after it was destroyed by the invading Sea Peoples in around 1178 BC. However, Hellenistic remains have been found in the upper levels of the tell (ruin-mound), and the summit is still occupied today. Continuous occupation throughout the Islamic period is likely, the mound having been named after a local Muslim saint or prophet, Nebi Mend. In Byzantine times, widespread occupation is evidenced by extensive remains at the foot of the tell, which is believed to represent the city of Laodicea ad Libanum.

References

Bibliography
 
 Sergey Ignatov, "Dardanians, Moesians and Phrygians in the Qadesh Inscriptions of Ramses II", Thracia, 11, 1995 (= Studia in honorem Alexandri Fol, Sofia, 1995).

External links
 Qadesh on the Orontes

Amarna letters locations
Archaeological sites in Homs Governorate
Canaanite cities
Former populated places in Syria